XENY-AM is a radio station on 760 AM in Nogales, Sonora, Mexico.

History
Ramón Guzmán Rivera obtained the concession for XENY, then on 1270 kHz, on September 11, 1961. It operated with 1,000 watts day and 250 watts night. Guzmán Rivera died in the mid-1990s and the station has continued in the family.

XENY moved to 760 kHz by the 1980s and raised its power to current levels by the 2000s.

References

Radio stations in Sonora